Persatuan Sepakbola Indonesia Jakarta ( 'Indonesian Football Association of Jakarta'; abbreviated as Persija formerly known as Persija Pusat), is an Indonesian professional football club based in the Indonesian capital city of Jakarta. Persija Jakarta is one of the most successful football clubs in Indonesia with 2 Indonesian League titles and 9 Perserikatan titles. It has never been in a lower league since a nationwide competition started in 1930, fifteen years before Indonesia became an independent country. Persija is one of the founders of the Indonesian football association PSSI, along with six other clubs. Persija's rivalry with fellow PSSI founder Persib Bandung has gone on for decades, occasionally marred by violence.

History

Foundation and early years
Persija has roots that predate the current Indonesian state, which declared independence in 1945. Its forerunner, the Voetbalbond Indonesische Jacatra (VIJ), was formed on 28 November 1928 as a football club for Indonesian residents of Jakarta when the Dutch were still colonizing the country. The name Jacatra refers to a fort on the northern coast of present-day Jakarta. VIJ, along with six other Indonesian clubs, established PSSI on 19 April 1930 and won the first PSSI-authorized competition in 1931, in 1937 VIJ did not enter the competition but after that the club was always in the top division.

Post-independence
VIJ changed its name to Persija in 1950, five years after the Indonesian independence. In mid-1951, a club with ethnic Chinese, Dutch and Eurasian players merged with the rebranded outfit. As the Indonesian national football team in the 1950s heavily depended on Persija players, its line-ups at that time were filled by many ethnic Chinese, Dutch and Eurasian players from the Jakarta club.

Amateur years (1951-1994)
After the 1945 independence, national football competitions in Indonesia centred on region-based associations of amateur clubs that received funding from the state. These associations, including Persija, played against each other in an annual tournament known as Perserikatan, which literally means union. Almost all of these associations were seen as representatives of the main ethnic group in their respective regions, flaming primordial sentiments. Multicultural Persija was the exception. Persija won six national titles in the Perserikatan years. However, its fanbase was small and less passionate compared to ethnic-based supporter groups of Persib Bandung, Persebaya Surabaya, PSM Makassar or PSMS Medan. As the Perserikatan games became popular and televised from the 1980s, the other clubs proved to be more dominant with their stronger band of supporters.

Semi-professional years (1994-2008)
PSSI tried to combine the popular Perserikatan teams with the professional clubs from the Galatama league, which was struggling to attract a healthy-sized audience as the clubs did not attract primordial sentiments, into a league called Liga Indonesia. Persija, with a weak fanbase, continued its poor streak in the early years of Liga Indonesia until former army general Sutiyoso was appointed as governor of Jakarta in 1997 amid nationwide demonstrations that demanded the end of military-backed authoritarianism and the start of democratic elections at all levels.

Recognizing that he must win support to secure another term, Sutiyoso used Persija as an outreach vehicle. In 1997, Sutiyoso rebranded Persija with a different colour. Orange replaced red to stress Persija's tiger symbol while national players were recruited and more professional management was introduced. The governor also wielded his powers to motivate other Jakarta clubs in Liga Indonesia, including the once-successful Pelita Jaya FC, to leave the capital city. To augment the fanbase, the Jakmania supporter group was created in December 1997. The total makeover paid off with Persija winning the 2001 national title, a fanbase developing into the biggest in the country and Sutiyoso securing a second term in 2002. The flip side of this top-down approach is constant taunts from supporters of other clubs calling Persija as "anak papa" (papa's boy), which has become louder since Persija won its next national title in 2018.

Professional years (2008-)
The emergence of the Indonesian Super League in 2008 came amid pressure on Perserikatan teams to stop relying on the state budget and increase professional management. Persija, with the ability to attract supporters, sponsors and quality players, evolved into a well-oiled machine that performed well in different forms of competitions in Indonesia. However, it failed to win a national title in these professional years until 2018 when it championed the 2018 Liga 1. While Jakmania turned the capital city orange after the crowning, supporters of other clubs mocked the victory as engineered so that Persija could finally end its 17-year drought. These naysayers argue that PSSI influenced several decisions during the season that unfairly benefitted Persija, including the goals scored in the 9 December 2018 game that sealed the title.

Controversy aside, Persija is undeniably one of Indonesia's leading clubs with a fanbase that is now considered as the biggest in Asia, according to a December 2020 survey by the Asian Football Confederation. Before the COVID-19 pandemic, Persija games could easily gather more than 50,000 people inside the stadium with thousands watching on public screens in neighbourhoods across the sprawling capital. Persija holds the record for highest attendance in a AFC Cup match when it faced with Johor Darul Ta'zim F.C. in 2018.

Stadium

Persija currently plays their home matches at Gelora Bung Karno Stadium (GBK) in Central Jakarta along with the Indonesian national football team.

Before settling at the large GBK, the club used smaller stadiums in Jakarta as their home ground. For the 2017 Liga 1 and much of the 2018 Liga 1, Persija had to relocate to nearby Bekasi and use the Patriot Chandrabhaga Stadium or the Wibawa Mukti Stadium when the GBK stadium underwent renovation for the 2018 Asian Games and was later used for the main venue of that multi-sports event.

Current Jakarta governor Anies Baswedan in 2019 decided to build a new stadium for Persija in North Jakarta, which is called the Jakarta International Stadium. The new stadium was completed in 2022.

However, there is also a campaign to rename the stadium after intellectual and national hero, Mohammad Husni Thamrin.

Players

Current squad

Out on loan

Reserve and academy players

Retired numbers
 12 -  "The 12th man", reserved for club supporters "The Jakmania".
 14 - Ismed Sofyan
 20 - Bambang Pamungkas

Coaching staff

Management

|-

 
|}

Kit colours

Persija Jakarta's traditional colour is red, which is used for their home kit. Jakarta Governor Sutiyoso in 1997 replaced it with orange to make it in line with the tiger symbol during the rebranding of the club. After 19 years, in 2016, Persija decided to return to red after a long national title drought. The experiment worked as Persija championed the top-tier league in 2018. Frequently, the colour of their away jersey is white. But sometimes, players wear black in their away matches. Orange has been kept as the color of their third jersey.

Supporters and rivalries

Supporters
Persija's supporters are called the Jakmania. Founded in 1997 by Gugun Gondrong and Ferry Indra Sjarif, the Jakmania is one of the biggest football fan groups in Indonesia and use orange as its main colour, even though the club have since switched to red. Persija's home matches could easily attract over 50,000 spectators before the COVID-19 pandemic. They often travel to away matches, except against rivals Persib Bandung and Persebaya Surabaya because of police restrictions. However, tragedy still strikes.  Haringga Sirla, a Jakmania member who dared to break the rule and travel to Bandung in September 2018, was beaten to death by a group of Vikings, supporters of Persib.

The anthem of Persija, "Persija Menyatukan Kita Semua", written by the Jakmania, is always sung after a match.

Rivalries

Persija's top rival is Persib Bandung from the West Java city of Bandung, 180 km away. This derby is known as the Old Indonesian Derby. The rivalry between the two teams has become violent in the 2000s due to the growth of ultras on each side. Influenced by some media and individuals who want the rivalry to be preserved, many hostile incidents involving the two support group have occurred with seven deaths so far.
In 2014, a reconciliation was held by the West Java Police to avoid future clashes, resulting in restrictions against travelling supporters. However, fans continue to break the rule and end up in violent altercations.

Persija also has rivalries with other former Perserikatan teams, especially PSM Makassar, Persebaya Surabaya and PSMS Medan.

Honours

Persija has won many titles, including from international tournaments, making the club as the most successful in Indonesia. Its last national title comes from the 2018 Liga 1.

Season-by-season records

Past seasons 

Key
 Tms. = Number of teams
 Pos. = Position in league

AFC (Asian competitions)
 Asian Club Championship/AFC Champions League
 2001-02 – First round
 2019 – Preliminary round 2
 AFC Cup
 2018 – ASEAN Zonal semi-finals
 2019 – Group stage

Continental record

AFC club ranking

Former coaches
After becoming professional, Persija Jakarta has been trained by a combination of foreign and local coaches. Sofyan Hadi was the first head coach who won a professional national title for Persija Jakarta in 2001 when he was also playing for the team. Brazilian Antonio Claudio also was playing in and coaching the same team, but as a fitness coach. Another Brazilian, Stefano Cugurra, led Persija to the 2018 national title.

Notable former players 

This is the list of several domestic and foreign former notable or famous players of Persija from time to time.

Indonesia 
  Soetjipto Soentoro
  Tan Ling Houw
  Sutan Harhara
  Rully Nere
  Dede Sulaiman
  Rahmad Darmawan
  Widodo Cahyono Putro
  Anang Ma'ruf
  Budiman Yunus
  Imran Nahumarury
  Francis Wewengkang
  Hendro Kartiko
  Kurniawan Dwi Yulianto
  Charis Yulianto
  Elie Aiboy
  Budi Sudarsono
  Aples Tecuari
  Hamka Hamzah
  Ortizan Solossa
  Atep Rizal
  Muhammad Ilham
  Aliyudin
  Agus Indra Kurniawan
  Rochy Putiray
  Nur'alim
  Anjas Asmara
  Anindito Wahyu
   Beto Gonçalves
   Osas Saha
  Adam Alis
  Gendut Doni Christiawan
  Alexander Pulalo
  Muhammad Roby
  Leo Saputra
   Greg Nwokolo
  Firman Utina
  Ponaryo Astaman
  Amarzukih
   Stefano Lilipaly
   Raphael Maitimo
  Farri Agri
  Bambang Pamungkas
  Gunawan Dwi Cahyo
  Fitra Ridwan
  Valentino Telaubun
  Michael Orah
  Talaohu Musafri
  Leonard Tupamahu
  Alfin Tuasalamony
  Dany Saputra
   Nol van der Vin
  Samosir Tamani
  Fahreza Agamal
  Defri Rizki
  Fariz Nur Hisyam
  Mulky Alifa Hakim
    Marc Klok
   Evan Dimas
   Novri Setiawan
   Ichsan Kurniawan
   Ahmad Bustomi
   Adixi Lenzivio
   Salman Alfarid
   Imam Fathuroman
   Ikhwan Ciptady
   Yoewanto Setya Beny
   Daryono
   Shahar Ginanjar
   Sandi Sute
   Ramdani Lestaluhu
   Feby Eka Putra
   Rachmad Hidayat
   Septinus Alua
   Rudi Widodo
   Heri Susanto
   Alfath Fathier
   Asri Akbar
   Sutanto Tan
   Arthur Irawan
   Rizky Darmawan
   Ambrizal Umanailo
   Vava Mario Yagalo
   Muhammad Hargianto
   Andik Rendika Rama
   Syahroni
   Samuel Christianson Simanjuntak
   Rafli Mursalim
   Adrianus Purnomo
  Ismed Sofyan

Asia 
   Miro Baldo Bento
   João Bosco Cabral
  Rohit Chand
   Precious Emuejeraye
   Agu Casmir
  Baihakki Khaizan
   Fahrudin Mustafic
  Jahongir Abdumominov
  Lam Hok Hei
  Park Kyung-min
  Jeong Kwang-sik
  Hong Soon-hak
   Reinaldo

Africa 
  Roger Batoum
  Abanda Herman
  Serge Emaleu Ngomgoue
  Louis Berty Ayock
  Olinga Atangana
  Pierre Njanka
  Eric Bayemi
   Emmanuel Kenmogne
  Mbeng Jean Mambalou
  Boakay Foday
  Oliver Makor
  Frank Seator
  Chinedum Antoni
  Sam Ayorinde
  Vata Matanu Garcia
   Alex Brown
  Makan Konaté

Europe 
  Martin Vunk
  Evgeni Kabaev
  Ivan Bosnjak
  Evgheni Hmaruc
  Želimir Terkeš
  Steven Paulle
  Joan Tomàs
  Marco Motta
  Marko Šimić

Americas 
   Addison Alves
  Antônio Cláudio
  Lorenzo Cabanas
  Ronald Fagundez
  Emanuel de Porras
  Gustavo Ortiz
  Robertino Pugliara
  Luciano Leandro
  Javier Roca
  Gustavo Chena
  Pedro Velázquez
   Fabiano Beltrame
   Sílvio Escobar
  Renan Silva
  Willian Pacheco
  Jaimerson Xavier
  Bruno Lopes
  Luiz Júnior
  Ivan Carlos
  Rodrigo Tosi
  Bruno Matos
   Xandão 
  Adolfo Fatecha
  Diego Caneza
  Yann Motta

Further reading

References

External links
 Official Website
 
 Sepakbola - The Football Travellers on FIFA's website

Persija Jakarta
Football clubs in Indonesia
Football clubs in Jakarta
Indonesian Premier Division winners
Association football clubs established in 1928
1928 establishments in the Dutch East Indies